Indian Creek USFS Airport  is a public use airport located at Indian Creek in Valley County, Idaho, United States. It is owned by the U.S. Forest Service. The airstrip is situated next to the Middle Fork Salmon River.

Facilities and aircraft
It has one runway designated 4/22 with a dirt surface measuring 4,650 by 40 feet (1,417 x 12 m). For the 12-month period ending April 21, 2009, the airport had 3,028 aircraft operations, an average of 252 per month: 66% general aviation and 34% air taxi.

References

External links
 Aerial image as of 28 September 1999 from USGS The National Map
 

Airports in Idaho
Buildings and structures in Valley County, Idaho
Transportation in Valley County, Idaho
United States Forest Service